Finally Awake is the fifth studio album released by Christian rock band Seventh Day Slumber. It was released on March 20, 2007 under Tooth & Nail Records. Finally Awake reached its peak on the Top Christian Albums chart at No. 16 in 2007.

Meaning 
When Joseph Rojas was asked about the meaning behind Finally Awake, he responded: "The message of this album is clear. We want to empower kids to stop looking to the media, to what the world tells them they have to be, to find identity. You don’t have to be what everyone else tells you to. Be what you were created to be."

Track listing 
 "Awake" - 3:42
 "Last Regret" - 3:08
 "Missing Pages" - 3:53
 "My Only Hope" - 3:45
 "Always" - 4:40
 "Breaking Away" - 3:35
 "Burning Bridges" - 3:54
 "Undone" - 3:26
 "On My Way Home" - 3:43
 "Broken Buildings" - 4:21
 "Every Saturday" - 4:20

References 

2007 albums
Tooth & Nail Records albums
Seventh Day Slumber albums